Ching-Ming Wang (王鏡銘) (born January 16, 1986) is a Taiwanese professional baseball player for the Uni-President Lions of the Chinese Professional Baseball League (CPBL).

Career
He spent 2008 in the minor league system of the La New Bears.

Wang made his pro debut with the Uni-President Lions in March 2010, allowing one run in six innings. He finished the 2010 season 10–3 with a 3.83 ERA, tying for sixth in the league in wins. He won Rookie of the Year honors.

In 2011, he was 10–6 with a save and a 3.90 ERA in 44 games. Had he qualified, he would have ranked 5th in ERA. He tied for fourth in wins, behind three foreign imports (Orlando Roman, Dan Reichert and Ken Ray); he was tied with Tyler Lumsden and rookie Ta-Yuan Kuan. He won games 2, 4 and 5 of the 2011 Taiwan Series to give the Lions the title (allowing one run in 9 1/3 IP for the Series); he was named Taiwan Series MVP. It was the fifth straight time the award went to a pitcher (following Luther Hackman twice, Nelson Figueroa and Jim Magrane) but the first time a Taiwanese player had won since 2006. In the Series finale, he was timed at 95 mph, a record for a Taiwanese native in a Taiwan Series (Hackman had been timed faster among all pitchers). No reliever had ever won 3 games in a Taiwan Series before.

International career
He was selected for Chinese Taipei national baseball team at the 2006 World University Baseball Championship, 2007 World Port Tournament, 2009 World Port Tournament, 2009 Asian Baseball Championship, 2009 Baseball World Cup, 2013 World Baseball Classic Qualification, 2013 World Baseball Classic, 2015 WBSC Premier12 2016 exhibition games against Japan and 2017 World Baseball Classic.

In the 2007 World Port Tournament, he was 1–1 with a 3.46 ERA. During the 2009 World Port Tournament, he was 1–0 with a save and one run allowed in 8 innings. He tied Miguel A. González for fifth in the event in ERA.

References

External links
Harry Wedemeijer

1986 births
Living people
Baseball pitchers
People from Taitung County
Taiwanese baseball players
Uni-President 7-Eleven Lions players
Uni-President Lions players
2013 World Baseball Classic players
2015 WBSC Premier12 players
2017 World Baseball Classic players